El Yali National Reserve is a nature reserve of Chile located in the southern portion of the Valparaíso Region. This coastal wetland is a Ramsar site and covers an area of 5.2 km2.

References

Ramsar sites in Chile
National reserves of Chile
Protected areas of Valparaíso Region